There are several Cordillera Central mountain ranges in the Andes Mountains of South America:

 Cordillera Blanca or Cordillera Central in the Ancash Region
 Cordillera Central, Bolivia
 Cordillera Central, Colombia
 Cordillera Central, Ecuador
 Cordillera Central, Peru in the Junín Region and in the Lima Region